This is a list of Grand Master Masons of the Grand Lodge of Scotland:

 1736–1737: William St Clair of Roslin
 1737–1738: George Mackenzie, 3rd Earl of Cromartie
 1738–1739: John Keith, 3rd Earl of Kintore (G.M. of England; 1740)
 1739–1740: James Douglas, 14th Earl of Morton (G.M. of England; 1741)
 1740–1741: Thomas Lyon, 8th Earl of Strathmore and Kinghorne (G.M. of England; 1744)
 1741–1742: Alexander Melville, 5th Earl of Leven
 1742–1743: William Boyd, 4th Earl of Kilmarnock
 1743–1744: James Wemyss, 5th Earl of Wemyss
 1744–1745: James Stuart, 8th Earl of Moray
 1745–1746: Henry Erskine, 10th Earl of Buchan
 1746–1747: William Nisbet
 1747–1748: Francis Wemyss-Charteris (de jure 7th Earl of Wemyss)
 1748–1749: Hugh Seton
 1749–1750: Thomas Erskine, Lord Erskine (Jacobite Earl of Mar)
 1750–1751: Alexander Montgomerie, 10th Earl of Eglinton
 1751–1752: James Hay, Lord Boyd (afterwards 15th Earl of Erroll)
 1752–1753: George Drummond (Lord Provost of Edinburgh)
 1753–1754: Charles Hamilton Gordon
 1754–1755: James Forbes, Master of Forbes (afterwards 16th Lord Forbes)
 1755–1757: Sholto Douglas, Lord Aberdour (afterwards 15th Earl of Morton) (G.M. of England; 1757–61)
 1757–1759: Alexander Stewart, 6th Earl of Galloway
 1759–1761: David Melville, 6th Earl of Leven
 1761–1763: Charles Bruce, 5th Earl of Elgin
 1763–1765: Thomas Erskine, 6th Earl of Kellie (G.M. of England-Ancients: 1760-66)
 1765–1767: James Stewart (Lord Provost of Edinburgh) 1765-67
 1767–1769: George Ramsay, 8th Earl of Dalhousie
 1769–1771: James Adolphus Oughton
 1771–1773: Patrick McDouall, 6th Earl of Dumfries
 1773–1774: John Murray, 3rd Duke of Atholl (G.M. of England-Ancients 1771-74)
 1774–1776: David Dalrymple (afterwards Lord Hailes)
 1776–1778: Sir William Forbes, 6th Baronet
 1778–1780: John Murray, 4th Duke of Atholl (G.M. of England-Ancients; 1775–81; 1791-1813)
 1780–1782: Alexander Lindsay, 23rd Earl of Crawford
 1782–1784: David Erskine, 11th Earl of Buchan
 1784–1786: George Gordon, Lord Haddo
 1786–1788: Francis Wemyss-Charteris, Lord Elcho
 1788–1790: Francis Napier, 8th Lord Napier
 1790–1792: George Douglas, 16th Earl of Morton
 1792–1794: George Gordon, Marquess of Huntly (afterwards 5th Duke of Gordon)
 1794–1796: William Kerr, Earl of Ancram (afterwards 6th Marquess of Lothian)
 1796–1798: Francis Stuart, Lord Doune (afterwards 10th Earl of Moray)
 1798–1800: Sir James Stirling, 1st Bt. (Lord Provost of Edinburgh)
 1800–1802: Charles Montagu-Scott, Earl of Dalkeith (afterwards 4th Duke of Buccleuch)
 1802–1804: George Gordon, 5th Earl of Aboyne (afterwards 9th Marquess of Huntly)
 1804–1806: George Ramsay, 9th Earl of Dalhousie
 1806–1808: Francis Rawdon-Hastings, 2nd Earl of Moira (afterwards 1st Marquess of Hastings)
 1808–1810: The Hon. William Maule (afterwards 1st Baron Panmure)
 1810–1812: James St Clair-Erskine, 2nd Earl of Rosslyn
 1812–1814: Robert Haldane-Duncan, 1st Earl of Camperdown
 1814–1816: James Duff, 4th Earl Fife
 1816–1818: Sir John Marjoribanks, Bt.
 1818–1820: George Hay, 8th Marquess of Tweeddale
 1820–1822: Alexander Hamilton, 10th Duke of Hamilton
 1822–1824: George Campbell, 6th Duke of Argyll
 1824–1826: John Campbell, Viscount Glenorchy (afterwards 2nd Marquess of Breadalbane)
 1826–1827: Thomas Hay-Drummond, 11th Earl of Kinnoull
 1827–1830: Francis Wemyss-Charteris, Lord Elcho (afterwards 9th Earl of Wemyss)
 1830–1832: George Kinnaird, 9th Lord Kinnaird
 1832–1833: Henry Erskine, 12th Earl of Buchan
 1833–1835: William Hamilton, Marquess of Douglas (afterwards 11th Duke of Hamilton)
 1835–1836: Alexander Murray, Viscount Fincastle (afterwards 6th Earl of Dunmore)
 1836–1838: James Broun-Ramsay, Lord Ramsay (afterwards 1st Marquis of Dalhousie)
 1838–1840: Sir James Forrest, 1st Baronet (Lord Provost of Edinburgh)
 1840–1841: George Leslie, 15th Earl of Rothes
 1841–1843: Lord Frederick FitzClarence
 1843–1864: George Murray, Lord Glenlyon (afterwards 6th Duke of Atholl)
 1864–1867: John Whyte-Melville
 1867–1870: Fox Maule Ramsay, 11th Earl of Dalhousie
 1870–1873: Robert St Clair-Erskine, 4th Earl of Rosslyn
 1873–1882: Sir Michael Shaw-Stewart, 7th Baronet
 1882–1885: Walter Erskine, 11th Earl of Mar
 1885–1892: Archibald Campbell, 1st Baronet (afterwards 1st Baron Blythswood)
 1892–1893: George Baillie-Hamilton, 11th Earl of Haddington
 1893–1897: Sir Charles Dalrymple of Newhailes, 1st Bt.
 1897–1900: Alexander Fraser, 19th Lord Saltoun
 1900–1904: Hon. James Hozier (afterwards 2nd Baron Newlands)
 1904–1907: Hon. Charles Maule Ramsay
 1907–1909: Thomas Gibson-Carmichael (afterwards 1st Baron Carmichael) (Grand Master of Victoria, Australia, 1909–12)
 1909–1913: John Stewart-Murray, Marquess of Tullibardine (afterwards 8th Duke of Atholl)
 1913–1916: Robert King Stewart of Murdostoun
 1916–1920: Sir Robert Gilmour, 1st Baronet
 1920–1921: Archibald Montgomerie, 16th Earl of Eglinton
 1921–1924: Edward Bruce, 10th Earl of Elgin
 1924–1926: John Dalrymple, 12th Earl of Stair
 1926–1929: Archibald Douglas, 4th Baron Blythswood
 1929–1931: Alexander Archibald Hagart-Speirs
 1931–1933: Robert Hamilton, 11th Lord Belhaven and Stenton
 1933–1935: Alexander Fraser, 20th Lord Saltoun
 1935–1936: Sir Iain Colquhoun of Luss, 7th Bt.
 1936–1937: The Duke of York (afterwards King George VI)
 1937–1939: Sir Norman Orr-Ewing, 4th Bt.
 1939–1942: Robert Balfour, Viscount Traprain (afterwards 3rd Earl of Balfour)
 1942–1945: John Christie Stewart
 1945–1949: Randolph Stewart, 12th Earl of Galloway
 1949–1953: Malcolm Barclay-Harvey (G.M of South Australia, 1941–44)
 1953–1957: Alexander Macdonald, 7th Baron Macdonald of Slate
 1957–1961: Archibald Montgomerie, 17th Earl of Eglinton
 1961–1965: Andrew Bruce, Lord Bruce (afterwards 11th Earl of Elgin)
 1965–1969: Sir Ronald Orr-Ewing, 5th Bt.
 1969–1974: David Liddell-Grainger
 1974–1979: Robert Wolrige Gordon
 1979–1983: James Wilson McKay
 1983–1985: J. M. Marcus Humphrey
 1985–1993: Sir Gregor MacGregor, 6th Baronet
 1993–1999: Michael Baillie, 3rd Baron Burton
 1999–2004: Sir Archibald Orr-Ewing, 6th Bt.
 2004–2005: The Rev. Canon Joseph Morrow
 2005–2008: Sir Archibald Donald Orr-Ewing, 6th Bt.
 2008–2018: Charles Iain Robert Wolrige-Gordon, 22nd of Hallhead and 11th of Esslemont 
 2018–present: William Ramsay McGhee

See also
 Freemasonry in Scotland

References

Grand Lodge of Scotland
Grand Lodge